Hickam Air Force Base is a United States Air Force (USAF) installation, named in honor of aviation pioneer Lieutenant Colonel Horace Meek Hickam. The installation merged in 2010 with Naval Station Pearl Harbor to become part of the newly formed Joint Base Pearl Harbor–Hickam, on the island of Oʻahu in the State of Hawaiʻi. The base neighbors Daniel K. Inouye International Airport and currently shares runways with the airport for its activities and operations.

Major units

Hickam is home to the 15th Wing (15 WG) and 67 partner units including Headquarters of Pacific Air Forces (PACAF), Hawaii Air National Guard and the 154th Wing (154 WG) of the Hawaii Air National Guard. The Air Mobility Command's 515th Air Mobility Operations Wing (515 AMOW) provides tactical and strategic airlift within the Pacific region.

In addition, Hickam supports 140 tenant and associate units.

The 15th Wing is composed of four groups each with specific functions. The 15th Operations Group (15 OG) controls all flying and airfield operations. The 15th Maintenance Group (15 MXG) performs aircraft and aircraft ground equipment maintenance. The 15th Mission Support Group (15 MSG) has a wide range of responsibilities but a few of its functions are Security, Civil Engineering, Communications, Personnel Management, Logistics, Services and Contracting support. The 15th Medical Group (15 MDG) provides medical and dental care.
 15th Operations Group (Tail Code: HH)
 15th Operations Support Squadron
 25th Air Support Operations Squadron
 535th Airlift Squadron (C-17 Globemaster III)
 65th Airlift Squadron (C-37B)
 19th Fighter Squadron (F-22 Raptor)
 15th Maintenance Group
 15th Medical Group
 15th Wing Staff Agencies
The 535th Airlift, 96th Air Refueling, and 19th Fighter Squadrons are each hybrid units joined with the Hawaii Air National Guard's 204th Airlift, and
199th Fighter Squadrons, respectively. These units are structured according to the USAF Total Force Integration (TFI) concept, and as such have both an active duty Commander and
a Guard Commander. They share missions as well as equipment.
 Major Tenant Units
154th Wing Hawaii Air National Guard
 515th Air Mobility Operations Wing

History

Origins 
In 1934, the Army Air Corps saw the need for another airfield in Hawaii when Luke Field on Ford Island became too congested for both air operations and operation of the Hawaiian Air Depot.  of land and fishponds adjacent to John Rodgers Airport and Fort Kamehameha were purchased by the War Department from the Bishop, Damon and Queen Emma estates for a new air depot and air base at a cost of $1,095,543.78. It was the largest peacetime military construction project in the United States to that date and continued through 1941.

The Quartermaster Corps was assigned the job of constructing a modern airdrome from tangled algaroba brush and sugar cane fields adjacent to Pearl Harbor. Planning, design, and supervision of construction were all conducted by Capt. Howard B. Nurse of the QMC. The site consisted of ancient, emerged coral reef covered by a thin layer of soil, with the Pearl Harbor entrance channel and naval reservation marking its western and northern boundaries, John Rodgers Airport (HIA today) to the east, and Fort Kamehameha on the south. The new airfield was dedicated on 31 May 1935 and named in honor of Lt Col Horace Meek Hickam, a distinguished aviation pioneer who was killed in an aircraft accident the previous November 5 when his Curtiss A-12 Shrike, 33-250, hit an obstruction during night landing practice on the unlighted field at Fort Crockett in Galveston, Texas and overturned. Construction was still in progress when the first contingent of 12 men and four aircraft under the command of 1st Lt Robert Warren arrived from Luke Field on September 1, 1937.

Hickam Field was completed and officially activated on September 15, 1938. By November 1939 all Air Corps troops and activities—including most facilities such as the chapel, enlisted housing, and theater, which were dismantled and ferried in sections across the channel—had transferred from Luke Field with the exception of the Hawaiian Air Depot, which required another year to move. In early 1939 construction began on the main barracks, a single three-story nine-winged structure to house 3,200 men at a cost of $1,039,000. Personnel began moving into the barracks in January 1940, and by its completion on 30 September 1940, it was fully occupied and the largest structure of any kind on an American military installation. It included barber shops, a 24-hour medical dispensary, a laundry, a post exchange, multiple squadron dayrooms, and a massive consolidated mess hall at its center, and thus was dubbed the "Hickam Hotel".

Hickam was the principal army airfield in Hawaii and the only one large enough to accommodate the B-17 Flying Fortress bomber. In connection with defense plans for the Pacific, aircraft were brought to Hawaii throughout 1941 to prepare for potential hostilities. The first mass flight of bombers (21 B-17Ds) from Hamilton Field, California arrived at Hickam on 14 May 1941. By December, the Hawaiian Air Force had been an integrated command for slightly more than one year and consisted of 754 officers and 6,706 enlisted men, with 233 aircraft assigned at its three primary bases: Hickam, Wheeler Field (now Wheeler Army Airfield), and Bellows Field (now Bellows Air Force Station).

World War II 

When the Imperial Japanese Navy attacked Oahu on 7 December 1941, its planes bombed and strafed Hickam to eliminate air opposition and prevent American aircraft from following them back to their aircraft carriers. Hickam suffered extensive damage and aircraft losses, with 189 people killed and 303 wounded. Notable casualties included nine Honolulu Fire Department (HFD) firefighters (three killed, six injured) who fought fires at Hickam during the attack; they later received Purple Hearts for their heroic actions that day in peacetime history, the only civilian firefighters awarded as such to date.

During World War II, the base became a major center for training pilots and assembling aircraft. It also served as the hub of the Pacific aerial network, supporting transient aircraft ferrying troops and supplies to—and evacuating wounded from—the forward areas—a role it would reprise during the Korean and Vietnam wars and earning it the official nickname "America's Bridge Across the Pacific".

Cold War 

After World War II, the Air Force in Hawaii consisted primarily of the Air Transport Command and its successor, the Military Air Transport Service (MATS), until 1 July 1957 when Headquarters Far East Air Forces completed its move from Japan to Hawai‘i and was redesignated the Pacific Air Forces (PACAF). The 15th Air Base Wing, host unit at Hickam AFB, supported the Apollo astronauts in the 1960s and 1970s; Operation Homecoming (return of prisoners of war from Vietnam) in 1973; Operation Babylift / New Life (movement of nearly 94,000 orphans, refugees, and evacuees from Southeast Asia) in 1975; and NASA's Space Shuttle flights in the 1980s and 1990s. Hickam is home to the 65th Airlift Squadron which transports theater senior military leaders throughout the world in the C-37B and C-40 Clipper aircraft. In mid-2003, the 15th Air Base Wing (15 ABW) was converted to the 15th Airlift Wing (15 AW) as it prepared to bed down and fly the USAF's newest transport aircraft, the C-17 Globemaster III. The first Hickam-based C-17 arrived in February 2006, with seven more to follow during the year. The C-17s will be flown by the 535th Airlift Squadron.

On September 16, 1985, the Secretary of the Interior designated Hickam AFB a National Historic Landmark, recognizing its key role in the World War II Pacific campaign. A bronze plaque reflecting Hickam's "national significance in commemorating the history of the United States of America" took its place among other memorials surrounding the base flagpole. Dominating the area is a large bronze tablet engraved with the names of those who died as a result of the 1941 attack. Other reminders of the attack can still be seen. Bullet holes mark many buildings in use, including World War II era hangars and the base hospital., including the tattered American flag that flew over the base that morning. It is on display in the lobby of the Pacific Air Forces Headquarters building, whose bullet-scarred walls (the structure was a barracks and mess hall known as "the Big Barracks" in 1941) have been carefully preserved as a reminder to never again be caught unprepared.

Accidents and incidents
On 22 March 1955, a United States Navy Douglas R6D-1 Liftmaster on descent to a landing in darkness and heavy rain strayed off course and crashed into Pali Kea Peak in the southern part of Oahus Waianae Range, killing all 66 people on board. It remains the worst air disaster in Hawaiis history and the deadliest heavier-than-air accident in the history of U.S. naval aviation.

Previous names
 Flying Field, Tracts A and B, near Ft Kamehameha, United States Army (Origins)
 Hickam Field, 21 May 1935
 Army Air Base, APO #953 (official designation, 16 May 1942 – 31 May 1946)
 Hickam Field, 1 Jun 1946
 Hickam Air Force Base, 26 March 1948 – 1 October 2010

Major commands to which assigned
 1935–1940: Hawaiian Dept, United States Army
 1940–1942: Hawaiian Air Force
 1942–1944: Seventh Air Force
 1944–1945: Army Air Forces Pacific Ocean Areas (Provisional)
 1945: Seventh Air Force
 1945–1946: Air Transport Command
 1946–1949: Pacific Air Command
 1949–1955: Military Air Transport Service
 1955–1957: Far East Air Forces
 1957–present: Pacific Air Forces

Geography
It was originally bounded on the north by Pearl Harbor Naval Shipyard, on the west by the Pearl Harbor entrance channel, on the south by Fort Kamehameha, and on the east by the airport complex. The original main gate is reached via Nimitz Highway (Hawaii Route 92) from Honolulu, and it shares its western terminus with the Pearl Harbor Naval Shipyard's main gate. This part of Nimitz Highway can be reached from the expressway Interstate H-1 (Exit 15) southeast from Halawa or west from Honolulu (Exit 15B) and from Kamehameha Highway (State Hawaii Route 99), the eastern termination of which is at Nimitz Highway.

The housing around the base is within the Hickam Housing CDP.

See also
 List of airports in Hawaii
 Hawaii World War II Army Airfields
 Arnold W. Braswell
 HABS/HAER documentation of Hickam Air Force Base for a listing of the documentation of Hickam Air Force Base Base by the Historic American Buildings Survey

References

 
 Arakaki, Leatrice R. and Kuborn, John R. (1991). 7 December 1941: The Air Force Story, Pacific Air Forces Office of History, Hickam AFB, Hawaii. 
 Maurer, Maurer (1983). Air Force Combat Units Of World War II. Maxwell AFB, Alabama: Office of Air Force History. .
 Mueller, Robert (1989). Active Air Force Bases Within the United States of America on 17 September 1982. USAF Reference Series. Maxwell AFB, Alabama: Office of Air Force History. 
 Ravenstein, Charles A. (1984). Air Force Combat Wings Lineage and Honors Histories 1947–1977. Maxwell AFB, Alabama: Office of Air Force History. .
 Rogers, Brian (2005). United States Air Force Unit Designations Since 1978. Hinkley, England: Midland Publications. .

External links

 Hickam Air Force Base
 History at Hickam
 Hickam AFB Installation Overview
 Aviation: From Sand Dunes to Sonic Booms, a National Park Service Discover Our Shared Heritage Travel Itinerary

Installations of the United States Air Force in Hawaii
Airports in Hawaii
Art Deco airports
Art Deco architecture in Hawaii
Buildings and structures in Honolulu County, Hawaii
Installations of the United States Air National Guard
Historic districts on the National Register of Historic Places in Hawaii
National Historic Landmarks in Hawaii
Transportation in Honolulu County, Hawaii
Historic American Buildings Survey in Hawaii
National Register of Historic Places in Honolulu County, Hawaii
Space Shuttle Emergency Landing Sites